Joe Chow Yat-ming, PMSM (Chinese: 周一鳴; born 1973) is the incumbent Deputy Commissioner of Police in charge of management since 28 April 2022. He previously served as Senior Assistant Commissioner of the Hong Kong Police Force. He replaced the retiring incumbent Kwok Yam-shu.

Career 
Mr. Chow Yat-ming, Joe joined the Force in 1995 as an Inspector of Police. He has a wealth of experience in criminal investigation, intelligence gathering work and policy-making at divisional, district, regional and headquarters levels. In 2010, Chow was promoted to Superintendent and served in the Crime Wing Headquarters. Between 2012 and 2013, he was seconded to Interpol General Secretariat in Lyon, France as a Criminal Intelligence Officer.

In 2013, soon after Chow got promoted to Senior Superintendent, he took up the office of Criminal Intelligence Bureau as the deputy in command. In just two years, he further advanced to Chief Superintendent and commanded the bureau.

In 2017, Mr Chow served as the District Commander of Yau Tsim District and was subsequently appointed as the Deputy Regional Commander of Kowloon West Region in early 2019.  During his tenure in Kowloon West Region, he handled the Polytechnic University Siege in November 2019.  He was promoted to Assistant Commissioner in February 2020 and in charge of the Operations Wing and then the Personnel Wing. In January 2021, he was promoted to Senior Assistant Commissioner and worked as the Director of Personnel and Training.  In August 2021, he took up the office of the Director of Crime and Security.

In April 2022, Mr Chow was appointed as the Deputy Commissioner of Police (Management).

Controversies and views 
In 2019, Chow was the commander of the police operation during the siege of the Hong Kong Polytechnic University. He led officers to block all exits to the Hong Kong Polytechnic University and announced that anyone leaving would be arrested for rioting. Additionally, police snipers fired tear gas from the building opposite to the Polytechnic whilst riot police worked on the ground. Rubber bullets were also shot at protesters and volunteer medics who would have otherwise assisted injured protesters had been arrested. Journalists who were leaving the campus during the siege were also lined against the walls, had their belongings searched, and had details of their identity documents and passports recorded.

After the siege had ended, in their two-day search, the police found a total of 3,801 Molotov cocktails (petrol bombs), 921 gas canisters, and 588 chemicals including acid and other corrosive liquids. Other weapons found included 100 gas canisters tied to petrol bombs, 12 bows, 200 arrows, and an air rifle. Additionally, 44 vehicles within the campus car park were damaged and protesters were believed to have stolen petrol from them.

Upon the end of Polytechnic University Siege, Chow stated that “the force is happy to see that the process has been conducted peacefully, and I want to reiterate that we have always followed two main principles, ‘peaceful resolution’ and ‘flexibility’”. He reiterated that “Police have zero tolerance for violence or lawbreaking, and we will continue to investigate this case”.

References

1973 births
Living people
Hong Kong Police commissioners